Adelanto Converter Station in Adelanto, California, is the southern terminus of the 2,400 MW Path 27 Utah–California high voltage DC power (HVDC) transmission line. The station contains redundant thyristor-based HVDC converters rated for 1,200 MW continuous or 1,600 MW short term overload.  The  station was completed in July, 1986 at a cost of US$131 million. The northern terminus of Path 27 is fossil fueled Intermountain Power Plant in Utah.

An adjacent $45 million AC switching station owned by Los Angeles Department of Water and Power links to the Southern California grid via five 500-kV AC lines.

ABB, who had built the station in 1986, upgraded its original 1,600 MW capacity to 2,400 MW in 2011.

In 2012, an 11.4 MW solar array (less than 1% of the Utah plant's capacity) was installed at the facility at a cost of $48 million obtained with loans subsidized by the American Recovery and Reinvestment Act of 2009.

Interconnects

Adelanto substation is connected to the following via 500 kV AC lines:
Marketplace substation in Nevada via Path 64
Victorville Switching Station (two lines)
RS-E (Toluca) in the eastern San Fernando Valley 
RS-Rinaldi in the northern San Fernando Valley

References

Further reading

External links

LADWP electrical system map showing AC and DC paths

Converter stations
Energy infrastructure in California
Western Interconnection
Energy infrastructure completed in 1986
1986 establishments in California